Riesman's sign is a clinical sign in which a bruit can be heard over the eye. It is found in patients with Graves' disease.

The sign is named after David Riesman.

References 

Medical signs